Stefanie Vögele was the defending champion, having won the event in 2012, but decided not to participate in 2013.

Luksika Kumkhum won the tournament, defeating Hiroko Kuwata in the final, 3–6, 6–1, 6–3.

Seeds

Main draw

Finals

Top half

Bottom half

References 
 Main draw

Dunlop World Challenge - Women's Singles
2013 Women's Singles
2013 Dunlop World Challenge